A Collection is a single-disc compilation album by Underworld, released on 4 December 2011 on underworldlive.com for digital download. A physical CD was released on 23 January 2012. At the same time, 1992-2012 The Anthology, a three disc compilation was also released.

References

2011 compilation albums
Underworld (band) albums